"Leavin" is a song by American R&B group Tony! Toni! Toné! It was released on April 12, 1994, as the fourth single from their 1993 album Sons of Soul. The optimistic, upbeat song features turntable scratches and a sample of A Tribe Called Quest's 1990 song "If the Papes Come". Music critics found the song's style and group member Raphael Wiggins' singing reminiscent of Smokey Robinson.

"Leavin'" charted at number 82 on the Billboard Hot 100 and at number 41 on the Hot R&B Singles. It attained its highest charting in New Zealand, where it peaked at number 30. The song also appeared on the soundtrack to the 1994 film Beverly Hills Cop III.

Music and lyrics 

Tony! Toni! Toné! recorded the song for their third album Sons of Soul, which was recorded and released in 1993. The song was produced by the group and written by group member Raphael Wiggins and guitarist John "Jubu" Smith.

"Leavin'" has an upbeat mood, a light, affectionate tone, soulful vocals, and sweeping string arrangements. Musically, it exemplifies the group's incorporation of traditional soul styles on Sons of Soul. It also features snippets of turntable scratches. It contains a sample of "If the Papes Come" by A Tribe Called Quest. Billboard observes "an overall summery feel" on "Leavin'" and calls it "a smile-inducer for pop and urban outlets." Gil Griffin of The Washington Post writes that the "sensual" song "evokes Temptations-style optimism" and that its strings and blues guitar riffs recall Smokey Robinson's 1967 song "I Second That Emotion". Laura Zucker of The Sacramento Bee compares Saadiq's falsetto singing on "Leavin'" to that of Robinson.

Music video 
A music video for "Leavin" was released in April 1994. It featured elaborate graphics and showed the group in alternating settings, including a lush country meadow, a hillside vista, and an urban hub at night, the latter of which featured lurid peep show marquees and pimps watching their prostitutes. Michael Saunders of The Boston Globe finds the video analogous to the group's musical fusion of classic and contemporary styles on Sons of Soul, writing that it "attempts to capture that merger visually with high-tech graphics, with a slinky soundtrack powering the mood."

Track listings

Track listings

Personnel 
Credits adapted from CD single (PolyGram #855763-2).

 The B Company – artwork
 Gerry Brown – mixing
 Ed Eckstine – executive producer
 Nicky Kalliongis – editing
 Tony! Toni! Toné! – producer

Charts

References

External links 
 

1994 singles
Songs written by Raphael Saadiq
Tony! Toni! Toné! songs
Songs written by Q-Tip (musician)
Songs written by Ali Shaheed Muhammad
1993 songs
Wing Records singles